Charles Winthrop Lowell (November 20, 1834 - October 3, 1877) was a lawyer, commanding officer of a "colored" unit of the Union Army during the American Civil War, state legislator and postmaster in New Orleans, Louisiana.

He was born in Farmingham, Maine November 20, 1834, to Hon. Phillip Smith Lowell and Harriet Butler Lowell.
In 1859 he graduated from Bowdoin College before going on to study law with the father of his future wife Hon. Charles P. Chandler.
He was admitted to the Maine Bar January, 1860.

He married Mary Elizabeth Chandler June 1860, and together they had a daughter born January 18, 1864, named Mary Chandler Lowell, and unfortunately Mary Elizabeth died just six days after giving birth.
Around 1870 he got married again to Sarah "Sally" W. Huff, but they did not have any children together.  

February 1863 he was appointed by Governor Abner Coburn to serve as a captain of the United States Colored Troops, and continued to serve after the war ended.  

He settled in New Orleans after the war, and was first a colonel and then was appointed to the position of provost marshal general.

He served as Speaker of the Louisiana House of Representatives, first elected July 1868, and then again unanimously elected December 9, 1872. He was identified as from Jefferson when he was re-elected as speaker in 1872.

In May 1877 he left New Orleans to return to New England where he was expected to die as he had been in bad health for two years and had been declining recently.
He died  October 3, 1877, in Foxcroft, Maine.

See also
List of speakers of the Louisiana House of Representatives

References

1834 births
1877 deaths
Speakers of the Louisiana House of Representatives
People from Farmington, Maine
United States Army Provost Marshal Generals
Union Army officers
Louisiana postmasters
People of Maine in the American Civil War
Politicians from New Orleans